Rev. Nenad M. Jovanovich is a Serbian Deacon of the Serbian Orthodox Church.

Honours 
  Royal House of Portugal: Knight Commander of the Order of Saint Michael of the Wing (September 2011)

External links 

Year of birth missing (living people)
Living people
Deacons
Eastern Orthodox Christians from Serbia
Place of birth missing (living people)